Allan Rodrigo Aal (born 17 March 1979), known as Allan Aal, is a Brazilian football manager and former player who played as a central defender.

Playing career
Born in Paranaguá, Paraná, Allan joined Coritiba's youth setup at the age of ten. He made his first team debut in 2000, aged 19, before moving to Botafogo in August 2002.

After representing Daejeon Citizen in South Korea, Allan returned to Coritiba in September 2004. He moved abroad again in 2006, with Italian side Triestina, but returned to Brazil in September of that year after signing for Londrina.

Allan moved to hometown side Rio Branco-PR for the 2007 Campeonato Paranaense. After being a regular starter, he moved to PAOK in June 2007, but terminated his contract six months later due to the club's financial problems, and returned to former side Rio Branco.

In 2009, after playing for Sinop, Allan retired at the age of just 30.

Managerial career
After retiring, Aal started working at former side Rio Branco, before being named manager of Coritiba's under-17 team on 22 May 2012. On 1 October 2015, he returned to Rio Branco, but now named first-team manager.

On 15 February 2016, after four defeats in the first four matches of the campaign, Aal was sacked. He took over Foz do Iguaçu for the 2017 season, and left the club on 15 February 2018 to manage Portuguesa.

Dismissed by Lusa on 6 November 2018, Aal managed Nacional-SP for a short period before being appointed at the helm of Cascavel, a club he was already linked in the pre-season but left to take over Nacional.

Still in 2019, after leaving Cascavel, Aal moved to Paraná as an assistant manager, but was named manager ahead of the 2020 season. He was relieved of his duties on 1 November 2020, and took over fellow Série B side Cuiabá fifteen days later.

Despite leading Cuiabá to a first-ever promotion, Aal left the club on a mutual agreement on 1 February 2021. He took over Guarani in the second division three days later, but was sacked 18 May.

Aal was announced as CRB manager on 24 May 2021. He was dismissed the following 10 February, after a poor start of the new campaign, and took over fellow second division side Novorizontino two days later.

On 19 June 2022, after suffering relegation in the 2022 Campeonato Paulista and a six-match winless run, Aal was sacked by Novorizontino. On 2 July, he replaced Dado Cavalcanti at the helm of fellow second division side Vila Nova.

On 23 November 2022, despite saving Vila Nova from relegation, Aal was sacked by the club.

Personal life
Aal comes from a family of footballers. His grandfather, his father Vivi and his brother Netinho were also footballers and defenders.

References

External links
 
 Allan Aal coach profile at Sambafoot
 

1979 births
Living people
Sportspeople from Paraná (state)
Brazilian footballers
Brazilian football managers
Brazilian expatriate footballers
Brazilian expatriate sportspeople in South Korea
Brazilian expatriate sportspeople in Greece
Expatriate footballers in South Korea
Expatriate footballers in Greece
Association football defenders
Campeonato Brasileiro Série A players
Campeonato Brasileiro Série B managers
Coritiba Foot Ball Club players
Botafogo de Futebol e Regatas players
Rio Branco Sport Club players
Sinop Futebol Clube players
Daejeon Hana Citizen FC players
PAOK FC players
Rio Branco Sport Club managers
Associação Portuguesa de Desportos managers
Paraná Clube managers
Cuiabá Esporte Clube managers
Guarani FC managers
Clube de Regatas Brasil managers
Grêmio Novorizontino managers
Vila Nova Futebol Clube managers
People from Paranaguá